Anna Osmakowicz (born 14 March 1963 in Warsaw) is a Polish singer and actress.

She studied piano, flute and singing and has taken part in several musicals, festivals and theatre plays such as "Orfeusz i Eurydyka w krainie tęczy", "Carmen", "Macbeth", "Otelo", "Fiddler on the Roof", and "Madame Butterfly".

Discography
 2005- En kristnaska hor (kolędy i pastorałki /esperanto)
 2006 - Kristabia festo (kolędy i pastorałki /esperanto)
 2008 - Wigilijna Noc (pastorałki)
 2009 - Dzisiaj Wielkanoc
 2009 - Intymny świat (ballady jazzowe)
 2009 - Kolędy

Compilations 
 1990 - Piosenki Tadeusza Prejznera
 1991 - Od Turowa jadę
 1992 - Miłość ubrana w wiersze
 1993 - Pastorałki i kolędy
 1999 - Ojcze Święty śpiewamy dla Ciebie
 2001 - Bilet do radości
 2002 - Rzeka wspomnień
 2005 - Pieśni dla Ojca Świętego Papieża Jana Pawła II

External links
  

1963 births
Living people
Polish women singers
Polish actresses
Musicians from Warsaw
Actresses from Warsaw